Carlos Augusto José Lira (born 2 April 1966), known as just Lira, is a Brazilian footballer. He played in eight matches for the Brazil national football team from 1990 to 1993. He was also part of Brazil's squad for the 1991 Copa América tournament.

References

External links
 

1966 births
Living people
Brazilian footballers
Brazil international footballers
Association football defenders
Footballers from Brasília